The Fresh Breeze Paratour Twin is a German twin-engined paramotor that was designed and produced by Fresh Breeze of Wedemark for powered paragliding.

Design and development
The aircraft was designed in the 1990s and features a paraglider-style high-wing, two-place accommodation and a two Quadra horizontally-opposed two-stroke  engines in pusher configuration. As is the case with all paramotors, take-off and landing is accomplished by foot.

The aircraft's twin-engine configuration is unique. The engines are positioned vertically, one above the other, so that a single engine situation does not create yaw and allows easy control in the event of a single engine failure. With only one engine operating the aircraft will not normally be capable of climbing with two people, but will give the pilot a wide range of choices for landing. Each engine drives its own propeller and both engines are supplied fuel by a single  tank via gravity feed.

Specifications (Paratour Twin)

References

1990s German ultralight aircraft
Twin-engined pusher aircraft
Paramotors
Paratour Twin